Silverbullit is a Swedish rock band based in Göteborg. Formed in 1995 under the name "Silverbullet", which was changed after a conflict over the rights for the name. They are known under the name Citizen Bird in the US, and have toured under that name and released their album Citizen Bird as a "self-titled" LP there. The band plays intense monotonous synth-influenced rock music with painloaded lyrics. Amongst others, sources of inspiration are DAF, Depeche Mode, New Order and The Stooges, as well as video game music. They have received a lot of praise from critics (for example, "Arclight" was announced to be the best Swedish album of 2004 by a vote of music reviewers ), but have not yet made a real popular break-through. 

The band is mostly known for their energetic live performances. They have done numerous festival gigs and have also toured together with The Soundtrack of Our Lives. Lead singer Simon Ohlsson is usually very wild and erratic on stage and several performances have gone awry. For example, early in the band's career, a gig in Varberg ended with Simon being dragged away by police who thought he was on drugs (it is said that he had only had one beer); and at Rookiefestivalen 2004 he jumped out into the sparse crowd and was thrown out from the venue by a security guard, while the rest of the band kept playing.

Members 

Simon Ohlsson (vocals, keyboards)
Jon Ölmeskog (keyboards)
Andreas Nilsson (guitars)
Jukka Rintamäki (bass, vocals)
Anders Gustafsson (drums)

Discography

Albums 

Silverbullit (1997)
Citizen Bird (2001)
Arclight (2004)

Singles 

"King of the line"
"Star"
"Magnetic city"
"Run"

External links 

Myspace
Live photos from Rockfoto.nu

Swedish musical groups